Tom Schultz (born January 4, 1947) is a retired Canadian football player who played for the Ottawa Rough Riders. He played college football at Queen's University.

References

1947 births
Living people
Ottawa Rough Riders players
Players of Canadian football from Ontario
Canadian football people from Ottawa